Chasse-sur-Rhône (literally Chasse on Rhône) is a commune in the Isère department in southeastern France.

The St. Joan of Arc Chapel, where Joan of Arc reputedly visited and prayed at the chapel on 9 March 1429 after meeting King Charles VII of France was originally built in Chasse-sur-Rhône, before being dismantled and transported to the United States, where it was rebuilt, in 1927.

Population

Twin towns
Chasse-sur-Rhône is twinned with:

  Nor Hachen, Armenia, since 1998
  Campobello di Licata, Italy, since 2003

See also
Communes of the Isère department

References

Communes of Isère